was a railway station located in Anamizu, Hōsu District, Ishikawa Prefecture, Japan. This station was abandoned on April 1, 2005.

Line
 Noto Railway
 Noto Line

Adjacent stations

External links 
 Kanami Station page at notor.info

Railway stations in Ishikawa Prefecture
Defunct railway stations in Japan
Railway stations closed in 2005
Railway stations in Japan opened in 1959